Get Real may refer to:

Film and TV
Get Real!, a programming block on the Canadian TV channel YTV
Get Real (British TV series), a 1998 sitcom
Get Real (American TV series), a 1999-2000 comedy/drama
Get Real! (1991 TV series), an American children's series featuring Brandon DeShazer
"Get Real" (8 Simple Rules), an episode of 8 Simple Rules
Get Real (film), a 1998 British film

Other
"Get Real", a track on some editions of the David Bowie album Outside
"Get Real" (song), a 1988 song by Paul Rutherford
Get Real, a 2012 album by Math the Band
Get Real, a novel in the John Dortmunder series by Donald Westlake